The term Know-Nothing Riot has been used to refer to a number of political uprisings of the Nativist American Know Nothing Party in the United States of America during the mid-19th century. These anti-immigrant and anti-Catholic protests culminated into riots in Philadelphia in 1844, St. Louis in 1854, Cincinnati and Louisville in 1855, Baltimore in 1856, Washington, D.C. and New York in 1857, and New Orleans in 1858.

Know-Nothing Riots (1844-1858)

Philadelphia Riot

St. Louis Riot

Cincinnati Riot
The Election Day Riots of 1855 occurred in Cincinnati between April 2-7, 1855. The election was between James J. Faran, the Democratic contender and editor of the Cincinnati Enquirer, and James D. Taylor, rabid nativist editor of the Cincinnati Times. Rumors of illegal voting, ballot-box stuffing, and naturalized voters preventing native-born citizens from voting sparked the events.

Louisville Riot
See Bloody Monday.

Baltimore Riot

See Know-Nothing Riots of 1856

Washington D.C. Riot
Know-Nothing associated gang, the Plug Uglies, had travelled to Washington D.C. from Baltimore on June 1, 1857 in an attempt to prevent German and Irish immigrants from voting in the local election. The Plug Uglies linked up with allied members of the Rip Raps and the Chunkers and moved to Mount Vernon Square to harass anti-Know Nothing voters. They then returned to the square armed with pistols, clubs, bricks, and other weapons and charged into the crowd of voters. A brutal fight broke out which the police were unable to stop and by noon, President Buchanan had called out two companies of Marines to stop the riot. By the time the Marines arrived at Mount Vernon Square, the Know-Nothings had set up a barricade and were armed with a cannon they had taken from the Navy Yard. Archibald Henderson, Commandant of the Marine Corps, marched up to the cannon and placed his body in front of it so it could not be aimed at his men. This allowed the Marines to advance on their position, but a fire fight soon broke out. 8 People were killed by the end of the day and many more were injured.

New York Riot

New Orleans Riot
The New Orleans Know-Nothing group began as a local movement in 1858 to reduce what residents considered a high rate of crime and violence in the city, primarily among Irish and German immigrants, who were among the poorest classes. A secret Vigilance Committee was formed to monitor their activities, and in particular to prevent disruption of upcoming municipal elections.

On the night of June 2, 1858, armed men under the command of Capt. J.K. Duncan, an officer in the United States Army, marched to Jackson Square and occupied the court rooms in The Cabildo. For the next five days, a standoff existed between the Vigilance Committee and members of the Native American Party. On June 7, the elections were held and the Native American candidate, Gerard Stith, defeated the Democratic Party candidate, P.G.T. Beauregard. The Vigilance Committee disbanded with no further violence.

Notable Know Nothing criminal gang rioters
American Guards (New York City)
Atlantic Guards (New York City)
Blood Tubs (Baltimore and Philadelphia)
Bowery Boys (New York City)
Killers (Philadelphia) 
O'Connell Guards (New York City)
Plug Uglies (Baltimore, Philadelphia, and New York City)
Rip Raps (Baltimore)
Roach Guards (New York City)
Shifflers (Philadelphia)

See also 
 History of St. Louis 
 Know-Nothing Riot of 1856
 List of incidents of civil unrest in the United States

References

Sources
 
 

1854 in the United States
1857 in the United States
1858 in Louisiana
1854 riots
1858 riots
Riots and civil disorder in Missouri
Riots and civil disorder in Louisiana
Political riots in the United States
1857 in Washington, D.C.
1854 in Missouri
Crimes in New Orleans
June 1857 events
June 1858 events
19th century in New Orleans
Riot